Jim MacBeth (7 April 1914 – 6 July 1997) was  a former Australian rules footballer who played with Richmond and St Kilda in the Victorian Football League (VFL).

Notes

External links 

1914 births
1997 deaths
Australian rules footballers from Victoria (Australia)
Richmond Football Club players
St Kilda Football Club players
Port Melbourne Football Club players